
Gmina Lubawka is an urban-rural gmina (administrative district) in Kamienna Góra County, Lower Silesian Voivodeship, in south-western Poland.

Neighbouring gminas
Gmina Lubawka is bordered by the town of Kowary and the gminas of Kamienna Góra and Mieroszów. It also borders the Czech Republic.

Villages
The gmina contains the villages of Błażejów, Błażkowa, Bukówka, Chełmsko Śląskie, Jarkowice, Miszkowice, Niedamirów, Okrzeszyn, Opawa, Paczyn, Paprotki, Stara Białka, Szczepanów and Uniemyśl.

Twin towns – sister cities

Gmina Lubawka is twinned with:
 Adršpach, Czech Republic
 Žacléř, Czech Republic

References

Lubawka
Kamienna Góra County